The 2020–21 season was RKC Waalwijk's  second consecutive season in the top flight of Dutch football, the Eredivisie. In addition to the domestic league, RKC Waalwijk participated in the KNVB Cup. The season covered the period from 1 July 2020 to 30 June 2021.

Players

First team squad

Transfers

Transfers in

Loans in

Transfers out

Competitions

Eredivisie

League table

Matches

KNVB Cup

References

RKC Waalwijk seasons
RKC Waalwijk